The Order of battle for the American airborne landings in Normandy is a list of the units immediately available for combat on the Cotentin Peninsula between June 6, 1944, and June 15, 1944, during the American airborne landings in Normandy during World War II.

American forces
Allied chain of command

Supreme Allied Commander:   Gen. Dwight D. Eisenhower

21st Army Group:   Gen. Sir Bernard Montgomery

U.S. First Army:   Lt. Gen. Omar Bradley

U.S. VII Corps:    Maj. Gen. J. Lawton Collins

VII Corps

82nd Airborne Division

 82nd Airborne Division:   Major General Matthew Ridgway
 325th Glider Infantry Regiment:  Col. Harry L. Lewis
 1st Battalion:  Lt Col. R. Klemm Boyd
 2nd Battalion:  Lt Col. John H. Swenson (WIA 11 June 44), Maj. Osmund Leahy, Maj. Roscoe Roy (KIA 15 June 44), Maj. Charles T. Major
 2nd Battalion, 401st Glider Infantry Regiment:  Lt Col. Charles A. Carrell (Relieved 9 June 44), Maj. Arthur W. Gardner (KIA 14 June 44); Maj. Osmund Leahy
 505th Parachute Infantry Regiment:  Col. William E. Ekman
 1st Battalion:  Maj. Frederick C. A. Kellam (KIA 6 June 44), Lt Col. Mark J. Alexander
 2nd Battalion:  Lt Col. Benjamin H. Vandervoort
 3rd Battalion:  Lt Col. Edward C. Krause
 507th Parachute Infantry Regiment:  Col. George V. Millet (POW 8 June 44), Lt Col Arthur A. Maloney, Col. Edson Raff
 1st Battalion:  Lt Col. Edwin J. Ostberg
 2nd Battalion:  Lt Col. Charles J. Timmes
 3rd Battalion:  Lt Col. Arthur A. Maloney
 508th Parachute Infantry Regiment:  Col. Roy E. Lindquist
 1st Battalion:  Lt Col. Herbert F. Batcheller (KIA 7 June 44), Maj. Shields Warren
 2nd Battalion:  Lt Col. Thomas J. B. Shanley
 3rd Battalion:  Lt Col. Louis G. Mendez
 319th Glider Field Artillery Battalion:  Lt Col. James C. Todd
 320th Glider Field Artillery Battalion:  Lt Col. Paul E. Wright
 376th Parachute Field Artillery Battalion:  Lt Col. Wilbur N. Griffith
 456th Parachute Field Artillery Battalion:  Lt Col. Wagner J. d'Alessio
 80th Airborne Antiaircraft Battalion:  Lt Col. Raymond E. Singleton
 307th Airborne Engineer Battalion:  Lt Col. Robert S. Palmer (POW 6 June 44), Maj. Edwin A. Bedell
 Pathfinder Group: Maj. Neal L. Roberts
 Attached:
 87th Armored Field Artillery Battalion:  Lt Col. George F. Barber
 746th Tank Battalion:  Lt Col. Clarence G. Hupfer
 899th Tank Destroyer Battalion:

101st Airborne Division

 101st Airborne Division: Major General Maxwell D. Taylor
 327th Glider Infantry Regiment:  Col. George S. Wear (relieved 9 June 44) Col. Joseph H. Harper
 1st Battalion:  Lt Col. Hartford T. Salee (WIA 10 June 44)
 2nd Battalion:  Lt Col. Thomas J. Rouzie
 1st Battalion, 401st Glider Infantry Regiment:  Lt Col. Ray C. Allen
 501st Parachute Infantry Regiment:  Col. Howard R. Johnson
 1st Battalion:  Lt Col. Robert C. Carroll (KIA 6 June 44), Lt Col. Harry W. O. Kinnard
 2nd Battalion:  Lt Col. Robert A. Ballard
 3rd Battalion:  Lt Col. Julian J. Ewell
 502nd Parachute Infantry Regiment:  Col. George Van Horn Moseley, Jr. (WIA 6 June 44), Lt Col. John H. Michaelis
 1st Battalion:  Lt Col. Patrick F. Cassidy
 2nd Battalion:  Lt Col. Steven A. Chapuis
 3rd Battalion:  Lt Col. Robert G. Cole
 506th Parachute Infantry Regiment:  Col. Robert Sink
 1st Battalion:  Lt Col. William L. Turner (KIA 7 June 44), Lt Col. James L. LaPrade
 2nd Battalion:  Lt Col. Robert L. Strayer
 3rd Battalion:  Lt. Col. Robert Lee Wolverton (KIA 6 June 44), Maj. Oliver M. Horton
 321st Glider Field Artillery Battalion: Lt Col. Edward L. Carmichael
 377th Parachute Field Artillery Battalion:  Lt Col. Benjamin Weisberg
 907th Glider Field Artillery Battalion:  Lt Col. Clarence F. Nelson
 81st Airborne Antiaircraft Battalion:  Maj. X. B. Cox, Jr.
 326th Airborne Engineer Battalion:  Lt Col. John C. Pappas (KIA 13 June 44)
 101st Pathfinder Company (Provisional):  Capt. Frank L. Lillyman
 Attached:
 65th Armored Field Artillery Battalion:  Lt Col. Edward A. Bailey
 70th Tank Battalion:  Lt Col. John C. Welborn

IX Troop Carrier Command
Maj. Gen. Paul L. Williams   (Grantham, Lincs)
 Command Pathfinder School:  Lt.Col. Joel E. Crouch, commandant  (RAF North Witham)
 1st Pathfinder Group (Provisional)

50th Troop Carrier Wing

Brig. Gen. Julian M. Chappell at RAF Exeter
 439th Troop Carrier Group:  Lt Col. Charles H. Young  (RAF Upottery)
 91st TCS:  Maj. Howard U. Morton
 92nd TCS:  Maj. Cecil E. Petty
 93rd TCS:  Maj. Robert A. Barrere
 94th TCS:  Maj. Joseph A. Beck II
 440th Troop Carrier Group:  Lt Col. Frank X. Krebs  (RAF Exeter)
 95th TCS:  Maj. Irvin G. Anderson
 96th TCS:  Capt. William R. Cooper
 97th TCS:  Maj. Jack S. Southard
 98th TCS:  Maj. Bascome L. Neal
 441st Troop Carrier Group:  Lt Col. Theodore G. Kershaw  (RAF Merryfield)
 99th TCS:  Lt Col. Walter T. Fletcher
 100th TCS:  Capt. James T. Cousin
 301st TCS:  Capt. Lloyd G. Neblett
 302nd TCS:  Lt. Col. Frederick Funston, Jr.

52nd Troop Carrier Wing
Brig. Gen. Harold L. Clark  at RAF Cottesmore
 61st Troop Carrier Group:  Col. Willis W. Mitchell  (RAF Barkston Heath)
 14th TCS:  Maj. Lewis S. Frederick, Jr.
 15th TCS:  Maj. Lawrence C. McMurtry
 53rd TCS:  Maj. Howard M. Betts
 59th TCS:  Maj. Marcus O. Owens, Jr.
 313th Troop Carrier Group:  Col. James J. Roberts, Jr.  (RAF Folkingham)
 29th TCS:  Lt Col. Quinn M. Corley
 47th TCS:  Maj. Paul W. Stephens
 48th TCS:  Maj. Edgar F. Stovall, Jr.
 49th TCS:  Lt Col. Frank J. Lumsden
 314th Troop Carrier Group:  Col. Clayton Stiles  (RAF Saltby)
 32nd TCS:  Maj. Halac G. Wilson
 50th TCS:  Maj. Joseph H. McClure
 61st TCS:  Maj. Campbell N. Smith
 62nd TCS:  Maj. Arthur E. Tappan
 315th Troop Carrier Group:  Col. Hamish McLelland  (RAF Spanhoe)
 34th TCS:  Lt Col. Donald G. Dekin
 43rd TCS:  Lt Col. Otto H. Peterson
 309th TCS:  Lt Col. Smylie C. Stark
 310th TCS:  Lt Col. Henry G. Hamby, Jr.
 316th Troop Carrier Group:  Col. Harvey A. Berger  (RAF Cottesmore)
 36th TCS:  Maj. James R. Roberts
 37th TCS:  Maj. Leonard C. Fletcher
 44th TCS:  Maj. Benjamin F. Kendig
 45th TCS:  Maj. Mars Lewis
 442d Troop Carrier Group:  Lt Col. Charles M. Smith  (RAF Fulbeck, attached from 50th TCW)
 303rd TCS:  Maj. Robert O. Whittington
 304th TCS:  Maj. Kenneth L. Glassburn
 305th TCS:  Maj. John A. Crandell
 306th TCS:  Maj. Royal S. Thompson

53rd Troop Carrier Wing
Brig. Gen. Maurice M. Beach at RAF Greenham Common
 434th Troop Carrier Group:  Col. William B. Whitacre  (RAF Aldermaston)
 71st TCS:  Maj. Glenn E. W. Mann, Jr.
 72nd TCS:  Maj. Frank W. Hansley
 73rd TCS:  Maj. Terry G. Hutton
 74th TCS:  Maj. Ralph L. Strean, Jr.
 435th Troop Carrier Group:  Col. Frank J. McNeese  (RAF Welford)
 75th TCS:  Maj. Lewis A. Curtis
 76th TCS:  Lt Col. Robert C. Lewis
 77th TCS:  Lt Col. Henry H. Osmer
 78th TCS:  Lt Col. Bertil E. Hanson
 436th Troop Carrier Group:  Lt Col. Adriel N. Williams  (RAF Membury)
 79th TCS:  Maj. John D. Kreyssler
 80th TCS:  Maj. Clarence L. Schmid
 81st TCS:  Maj. David W. Brack
 82nd TCS:  Capt. Robert G. Johns
 85th TCS:  Capt. Lester L. Ferguson (temporary attachment from 437 TCG)
 437th Troop Carrier Group:  Col. Cedric E. Hudgens  (RAF Ramsbury)
 83rd TCS:  Capt. John White
 84th TCS:  Capt. John M. Campbell
 86th TCS:  Maj. Ralph E. Lehr
 438th Troop Carrier Group:  Lt Col. John M. Donalson  (RAF Greenham Common)
 87th TCS:  Lt Col. David E. Daniel
 88th TCS:  Maj. Robert W. Gates
 89th TCS:  Maj. Clement G. Richardson
 90th TCS:  Maj. Howard I. Pawlowski

German forces
German chain of command

Supreme Command West:   Generalfeldmarschall Gerd von Rundstedt

Army Group B:   Generalfeldmarschall Erwin Rommel

Seventh Army:   Generaloberst Friedrich Dollman (died 28 June)

LXXXIV Corps:   General der Artillerie Erich Marcks (KIA 12 June)

German 7th Army

ArmeeReserve
 91st Air Landing Division:   Generalleutnant Wilhelm Falley
 1057 Grenadier-Regiment:  Oberst Sylvester von Saldern (La Haye-du-Puits)
 1058 Grenadier-Regiment:  Oberst Kurt Beigang (Saint-Cyr)
 191 Artillerie-Regiment:  Oberstlautnant Heinrich Kiewitt (Les Carrières)
 91 Fusilier Battalion
 191 Mountain Flak Battalion
 191 Panzerjäger Company
 6th Parachute Regiment:   Oberstleutnant Friedrich von der Heydte (L'Hotellerie)
 1./6:  Hauptmann Emil Priekschat (Mont-Castre)
 2./6:  Hauptmann Rolf Mager (Lessay)
 3./6:  Hauptmann Horst Trebes (Rougeval)

LXXXIV Corps
 243rd Infantry Division:   Genlt. Heinz Hellmich (KIA 17 June)
 920 Grenadier-Regiment:  Oberst Bernhard Klosterkemper (Etoupeville)
 921 Grenadier-Regiment:  Oberstleutnant Jacob Simon (Mauger)
 922 Grenadier-Regiment:  Oberstleutnant Franz Müller (Haquets)
 243 Artillerie-Regiment:  Oberst Eduard Hellwig (Le Vrétot)
 561 Ost Battalion (Russian):  (Flamanville)
 206 Panzer Battalion:  Major Ernst Wenk (Audenville)
 243 Panzerjäger Company:  (La Commanderie)
 709th Infantry Division:   Genlt. Karl W. von Schlieben
 729 Grenadier-Regiment:  Oberst Helmuth Rohrbach (Le Vicel)
 739 Grenadier-Regiment:  Oberst Walter Köhn (Querqueville)
 919 Grenadier-Regiment:  Oberstleutnant Günther Keil (Montebourg)
 1709 Artillerie-Regiment:  Oberst Robert Reiter (Equeurdreville)
 649 Ost Battalion (Russian):  (La Brasserie)
 795 Ost Battalion (Georgian):  Hauptmann Stiller (Turqueville)
 709 Panzerjager Company:  Hauptmann Willi Hümmerich (Le Catelet)
 752 Grenadier-Regiment (zbV):  Oberst Kessler (Gavray)
 635 Ost Battalion (Russian):  (Donville-les-Bains)
 797 Ost Battalion (Georgian):  hauptmann Peter Massberg (Gouville)
 Attached independent units:
 Sturm Battalion AOK 7:    Major Hugo Messerschmidt (Le Vicel)
 100th Panzer Replacement Battalion (100.Panzer Ersatz und Ausbildungs Abteilung):  Major Bardtenschlager (Francquetot)
 101st Stellungswerfer Regiment:  Major Rasner (Vasteville)

External links
 German battalion dispositions in Normandy, 5 June 1944
 506-PIR in Normandy - European Center of Military History

References

 Warren, Dr. John C. USAF Historical Study 97: Airborne Operations in World War II, European Theater (1956). Air University.
 
 Panzer Ersatz und Ausbildungs Abteilung 100
 German Order of Battle well-documented site on OB, strengths, and casualties by Niklas Zetterling.
 U.S. Airborne in Cotentin Peninsula
 "The Airborne Assault" - Utah to Cherbourg, United States Army Center of Military History.
 Zaloga, Steven J. D-Day 1944 (2): Utah Beach & the US Airborne Landings (2004). Osprey Publishing.
 Laugier, Didier Les Panzer Abteilungen Indépendantes de l'AOK 7: Beutepanzer en Normandy (2004) 39-45 Magazine #213 p30-37. This French article includes the official "Gliederungen" of 206.Pz.Abt. and 100.Pz.Ers.u.Ausb.Abt.

World War II orders of battle